Vallbona is a neighbourhood in the Nou Barris district of Barcelona, Catalonia (Spain), in the city's northern outskirts.

It is connected to Torre Baró and the rest of the Nou Barris district by a bridge spanning the motorways.

Vallbona was a small village until the middle of the twentieth century when most of it was demolished, the Rec Comtal canal mostly covered over, and high-density housing built. The motorways were built starting in the 1960s.

Its population in 2013 was 1,330, giving a population density of 2,224 per km2.

References

Neighbourhoods of Barcelona
Nou Barris